The Women's triple jump event  at the 2006 IAAF World Indoor Championships was held on March 10–11.

Medalists

Results

Qualification
Qualifying perf. 14.15 (Q) or 8 best performers (q) advanced to the Final.

Final

References
Results

Triple
Triple jump at the World Athletics Indoor Championships
2006 in women's athletics